Yilan Plain, also called the Lanyang Plain, or historically Kabalan, Kapsulan, Komalan is a plain in Yilan County, Taiwan. The plain has an alluvial fan which formed by Lanyang River. The plain was formed in the shape of nearly equilateral triangle. The broad and flat feature of this plan has made transportation so convenient in the region which drew large population to the towns and cities in the area.

The plain was inhabited by the Kavalans, an aboriginal group which mostly had migrated to southern places such as Hualien and Taitung.

See also
 Yilan County, Taiwan
 Geography of Taiwan

References

Plains of Taiwan
Landforms of Yilan County, Taiwan